Bell Creek Academy is a U.S. middle and high school in Riverview, Florida. It operates as part of Charter School Associates. The Panther is the school mascot. In May 2013, construction of the middle school and high school campus on Boyette Road was under construction for the school to open for the 2013–2014 school year.  Bell Creek is managed by Charter School Associates, a management company which runs more than 20 schools in the state of Florida.

Student Government

The Bell Creek Academy Student Government Association (SGA) is the High School representing body of the students. Established in 2015, its positions are as follows:

President
Vice President
Vice President of Marketing
Vice President of Finance
Secretary
Student Life Committee
This is composed of Class Presidents and Class Vice Presidents

Sports 
Bell Creek Academy has both boys and girls sports, including:

Middle School Boys 
• Boys Baseball

• Junior Varsity Basketball

• Varsity Boys Basketball

Middle School Co-Ed 
• Volleyball 

• Soccer 

• Track & Field

• Cross Country

• Flag Football 

• Hockey

High School Boys 
• Basketball

• Soccer

• Baseball

High School Girls 
•  Soccer

• Basketball

High School Co-Ed 
• JV Football

• Varsity Football

• Track & Field

• Cross Country

• Bowling

• Wrestling

Notable accomplishments 
BODYARMOR 8-Man Series/ Class A State Champions

Abby Dicenzo on September 24th, 2021 became the first woman to score a rushing touchdown in a varsity football game in Florida history.

References

External links

Charter schools in Florida
High schools in Hillsborough County, Florida
2013 establishments in Florida
Educational institutions established in 2013